Isaac Le Maire  (c. 1558 in Tournai – September 20, 1624 in Egmond aan den Hoef) was a Walloon-born entrepreneur, investor, and a sizeable shareholder of the Dutch East India Company (VOC). He is best known for his constant strife with the VOC, which ultimately led to the discovery of Cape Horn.

Isaac Le Maire was born in 1558 or 1559 in Tournai. He learned the trade from his merchant brother-in-law Jacques van de Walle. Isaac had four brothers, three of whom were merchants. Already in 1584 he was registered in Antwerp as a wealthy grocer. At the time, he was also captain of the company of the Antwerp militia. He rented the house of Bourgognien Schilt, but in 1585 after the fall of Antwerp he fled to the northern Netherlands.

In 1585 he settled in Amsterdam. He was married in Antwerp to Maria Jacobsdr. Walraven and they had 22 children, and one of them, his son Jacob, would go down in history as an explorer. In 1641 his son Maximiliaen became the first VOC chief of Dejima in Japan.

Initially, Isaac Le Maire was the largest shareholder in the VOC.

Merchant in Amsterdam
In 1592 his name was registered for the first time in Amsterdam as a participant in the oldest marine insurance policy. In the following years he grew into the trade in European waters. Initially, he wasn't one of the wealthiest merchants, but he could make major investments by ensuring warrant positions within the direct and indirect family network. 

Together with Peter van de Pulle and Dirck van Os he constituted a company for trading in Russia. They carried Baltic grain and timber to Spain. Ships with leather, wax, fur and caviar from Archangelsk often were destined for Venice and Livorno. They also traded in bills of exchange, chartering and marine insurances. Between 1594 and 1598 he had a major position in the fish trade between British ports and Spain.

After Cornelis de Houtman made the first trip to the Indies from 1595 to 1597, Le Maire, like many other merchants, plunged into the Indian adventure. In 1599 he and several others in Amsterdam established the Brabant Company, which carried out two voyages to the Indies. The Brabant Company was very successful, it quickly yielded the company 400% profit.

In 1600 he decided to concentrate on trade with the East Indies, but at that time he already acted in the West Indies as well. In 1601 he officially became a citizen of Amsterdam, which was no doubt because of the merger of the New Brabant Company and the Old Company into the First United East Indies Company in Amsterdam. This company, in which Le Maire was a participant, fitted out eight ships to the Indies, led by Jacob van Heemskerk.

Shareholder of the Dutch East India Company
In 1602, at the insistence of Johan van Oldenbarnevelt, all Dutch trading companies merged into the Vereenigde Oostindische Compagnie (VOC) (also known as the Dutch East India Company). Le Maire applied for shares for the sum of 85,000 guilders and he became the largest shareholder in the VOC.  He got the high position of governor of the VOC. But he soon fell into conflict with the VOC and the Amsterdam Consistory as a result of malpractice concerning the journey of Wijbrant van Warwijck in 1602. There were rumours that Le Maire intentionally did not submit receipts and other evidence of his share in the costs. The partners of the VOC let him be sued by the sheriff, but Le Maire settled the matter for 1200 guilders. The details of the offence were held secret. Because of this matter le Maire was forced to leave the VOC in 1605, while he also had to waive acting as a competitor of the VOC. This event was the foundation of his resentment and opposition against the VOC for the rest of his life. After leaving the VOC, he threw himself upon the European coasting trade, especially in grain. However, the thought of the lucrative trade with the Indies haunted him.

Competitor of the Dutch East India Company
Le Maire found his first opportunity to thwart the VOC in the efforts of France to set up a French trading company for India. King Henry IV of France invited him in 1607 for that purpose. Le Maire advised the French on the establishment and organization of a company, and in doing so ignored the competition stipulation with the VOC. However, at that time a French company was not yet established.

Next came the idea to involve Henry Hudson in the French plans. Hudson had already made two unsuccessful attempts for England to find a new North-Eastern passage, and in 1608 he came to the Netherlands to interest the VOC for that plan. He came in contact with Le Maire who proposed to the king of France to finance this expedition. With this attempt to find a new route to the Indies, Le Maire would not commit a breach of contract with the VOC, because the VOC only had a patent to trade via the Cape of Good Hope and the Strait of Magellan, until then the only two known routes to the Indies. The VOC got scent of this intention and offered Hudson a better contract, which ultimately led to his famous third voyage in 1609, discovering the river that was named after him. After the VOC had caught away Hudson, Le Maire and the king of France secretly came to an agreement to make the North-Eastern journey with another captain. The newly to be discovered strait would be named after the French king, and the new discoveries would be made under the French flag. However, the voyage, led by Melchior van den Kerckhove, was a failure.

In 1609, Isaac Le Maire travelled together with Joris van Spilbergen, Balthazar de Moucheron and others to Paris, again to discuss the formation of a French East India Company. De Moucheron played a double role in these discussions, because at one point he asked the ambassador of the Netherlands what it would be worth if he would disrupt the proceedings. The discussions so flagged because of mistrust by the French in Le Maire. Within the VOC the intrigues of Le Maire led to indignation, but it did not result in actual actions against him, probably because the Republic was not looking for a conflict with France during the war with Spain. In 1610 the King of France was killed and thus plans for a French East India Company were shelved.

Speculator against the Dutch East India Company

Isaac Le Maire also tried to use his knowledge of the VOC to cross the company financially. In 1609 he and eight others founded a secret company with the purpose to trade in VOC shares. Le Maire owned nearly one quarter of its shares. This so-called "Grote Compagnie" sold short shares of the VOC, that is, without actually owning them. By the time these shares were to be delivered, there was an interest in keeping the share price as low as possible. Le Maire probably expected that the competition by the still to be created French East India Company would ensure that the share price of the VOC dropped significantly. However, the French company was shelved. Rumours were spread to depress the prices, anyway. Such activities were detrimental to the (existing) VOC shareholders, who sometimes were forced to sell their shares at a low price. In particular, in 1609 the share price fell significantly, and the VOC imputed this to the machinations of Le Maire.

The VOC attempted via the States-General of the Netherlands to impose restrictions on free trade in VOC shares, which the company of Le Maire fiercely resisted. They claimed, the price drop was the result of the bad course of actions of the VOC. But the States-General decided in 1610 to prohibit the sale of shares not in possession (short selling). During 1610 and 1611 the stock price of the VOC increased. The company of Le Maire then suffered big losses because many shares had to be delivered at a lower price than the market. They were therefore compelled to deliver shares at a loss. Several members of his company went bankrupt and Le Maire had also suffered significant losses, but he could still meet his obligations. This fiasco led him to withdraw from Amsterdam.

Dutch East India Company monopoly broken 
Isaac Le Maire sold his property in Amsterdam and retired to his possessions in Egmond aan den Hoef, which he had bought between 1598 and 1600 from the estate of the Count of Egmont. After some time, he again started to make plans to break the VOC monopoly. The VOC owned by patent from the States-General the Dutch monopoly on travels to the Indies via the Cape of Good Hope and through the Strait of Magellan, until then the only two known passages to the Indies. From various travel accounts Le Maire assumed that south of the Magellan Strait another passage from the Atlantic to the Pacific Ocean could exist. In 1614 he founded the Austraalse Compagnie for the purpose of discovering this passage, which would fall outside the VOC monopoly. The voyage was prepared in Hoorn. Two ships were fitted out, the Eendracht and the Hoorn. The journey would be made under the responsibility of his son Jacob Le Maire. Willem Schouten was recruited as an experienced captain. The sailing orders expressly forbade a passage through the Strait of Magellan, even if a new route to the Pacific Ocean could not be found. Furthermore, the expedition was forbidden to trade on the coasts where the VOC had a trading post. At that time, there was still the expectation that a great unknown South Land would exist. Isaac Le Maire hoped to discover it, and in this way tap into an unimagined trading area. But above all, his motive was to circumvent the VOC monopoly. But Isaac gave his son a remarkable secret instruction: although the official sailing order was that no trade should be driven on the coasts where the VOC was established, on arrival in the Indies his son had to make clear to the administrators of the VOC that their monopoly had not been violated, because they had not sailed via the Cape of Good Hope or the Strait of Magellan. Then, he should ask permission to still be allowed to trade. Isaac le Maire anticipated it would not be granted, so Jacob would then have to do everything needed to win Governor-General Gerard Reynst, who had been, like Isaac Le Maire, a participant in the Brabant Company, for their cause. This even went so far as to Jacob asking Van Reynst the hand of one of his daughters. In this way Isaac le Maire tried to sow dissension within the VOC, because if Gerard Reynst allowed them to trade in this way it could lead to a major conflict within the VOC.

On June 14, 1615 the two ships set sail from Texel. The journey was a success in that, with the discovery of the passage round Cape Horn, the monopoly of the VOC was indeed broken, but the unknown South Land was not discovered, and the secret instruction could not be put into action because Gerard Reynst was already deceased.

After the ships had left Texel, the VOC got wind of the real intention of the travel. Therefore, the order was sent to the Indies that, if the expedition would arrive there, the ships would have to be confiscated because of a breach of the VOC's patent. And so it happened. Jacob Le Maire and Willem Schouten were sent back to the Republic, but Jacob Le Maire died during the return voyage. The VOC attempted to rewrite history by assigning the new discoveries to Willem Schouten.

The aftermath of the voyage
Isaac Le Maire had to fight many years to obtain his right. In 1619 the court ruled that the ship Eendracht was unlawfully seized by the VOC. The journals were to be returned to Le Maire, and in 1622 Le Maire could finally publish the Spieghel der Australische Navigatie door den Wijtvermaerden ende Cloeckmoedighen Zee-heldt Jacob Le Maire, to do justice to the discoveries of his son. For the damage, he was awarded 64,000 pounds. However, the court ruled that the Austraalse Compagnie was not allowed to trade in the Indian region, but that they did have the right to travel across the newly discovered route around Cape Horn. However, one year earlier the Dutch West India Company was established and in its patent it received also the monopoly on travels through the Strait of Magellan and other routes in that region. This was contrary to the rights that were granted to Le Maire's Austraalse Compagnie.

Le Maire died on September 20, 1624. He was buried in the Buurkerk in Egmond-Binnen, and on his tombstone he had written that he had lost during 30 years (except for his honour) 1.5 million guilders, a considerable sum at that time. His Australian Company continued the legal fight, but ultimately the States-General decided in 1644 to the detriment of the company.

See also 
 Financial history of the Dutch Republic

References 
 Engelbrecht, W.A. en Herwerden, Dr. P.J. van (1945) De ontdekkingsreis van Jacob le Maire en Willem Cornelisz. Schouten in de jaren 1615-1617, Journalen, documenten en andere bescheiden. De Linschoten-Vereeniging XLIX. Den Haag: Martinus Nijhoff.
 Wijnroks, E.H. (2003) Handel tussen Rusland en de Nederlanden, 1560-1640 Hilversum: Verloren
 Schoorl, H. (1968) Isaäc le Maire, koopman en bedijker Haarlem: Tjeenk Willink en zoon

1550s births
1624 deaths
People from Tournai
Founders of the Dutch East India Company
17th-century Dutch businesspeople
Emigrants from the Holy Roman Empire to the Dutch Republic